Mohamud Abdi Gaab was the governor of Hiraan from 2011 to 2014.

On 1 January 2012, Gaab arrived in the Kenyan capital, Nairobi, with an accompanying delegation from Uganda. During his time there, he met with various intellectuals, scholars and religious leaders of Hiraan.

References

Living people
Ethnic Somali people
Year of birth missing (living people)
Somalian politicians